Alejandro Guerra (born 28 September 1965) is an Argentine biathlete. He competed in the men's sprint event at the 1992 Winter Olympics.

References

1965 births
Living people
Argentine male biathletes
Olympic biathletes of Argentina
Biathletes at the 1992 Winter Olympics
Place of birth missing (living people)